Humaytá was a modified  built in Italy for the Brazilian Navy. The submarine was laid down by Odero-Terni-Orlando at La Spezia on 19 November 1925, launched on 11 June 1927, and handed over to the Brazilian Navy on 11 June 1929. Proceeds from the sale of the Marshal Deodoro to the Mexican Navy provided funds for Humaytás purchase. Humaytá was commissioned into the Brazilian Navy on 20 July 1929. She remained in Brazilian service through World War II and was decommissioned on 25 November 1950.

See also
 List of submarines of the Second World War

References 

Balilla-class submarines of the Brazilian Navy
Ships built in La Spezia
Ships built by OTO Melara
1927 ships
World War II submarines of Brazil
Brazil–Italy relations